Conrad Ledge is a flat-topped ridge  long between Hilt Cirque and Dana Cirque in The Fortress, Cruzen Range, Victoria Land. Named by the Advisory Committee on Antarctic Names in 2005 after Lieutenant Commander Lawrence J. Conrad, U.S. Navy (Ret.), Squadron VXE-6 helicopter pilot at McMurdo Station from 1982 to 1985; member of the United States Antarctic Program project to photograph named geographic features in the McMurdo Sound region, 2003–04.

References

Mountains of Victoria Land